Clyne is a village in the Neath Port Talbot county borough, Wales, and is the main settlement in the community of Clyne and Melincourt which with the community of Resolven make up the electoral ward of Resolven. The population at the 2011 census was 819.
The community includes a large rural area and the River Neath and Neath Canal form the western boundary.

References

External links 
www.geograph.co.uk : photos of Clyne and surrounding area

Villages in Neath Port Talbot
Vale of Neath